Grande Prairie is a provincial electoral district in Alberta, Canada, that has existed twice, first from 1930 to 1993 and again from 2019. It is one of 87 districts mandated to return a single member (MLA) to the Legislative Assembly of Alberta.

Geography

Grande Prairie is a predominantly urban riding. The riding includes most of the City of Grande Prairie, including the downtown core, residential areas to the north, west, and south, and a small agricultural area to the northwest that falls within city limits. Some neighbourhoods on the city's east side are part of Grande Prairie-Wapiti, a rural riding that completely surrounds its urban counterpart.

The riding also includes the community of Flyingshot Lake, which is immediately adjacent to the city but is governed as part of the County of Grande Prairie No. 1.

Grande Prairie is one of only five urban ridings in Alberta outside of Edmonton and Calgary, and the only one located in Northern Alberta.

Boundary history
The first incarnation of Grande Prairie, a sprawling rural district, was created out of the southern half of Peace River in 1930. It was reduced in size for the 1940 election when its northern area was transferred to the new district of Spirit River, and further reduced in 1986 to the city of Grande Prairie and the rural areas to its west and south. The riding was abolished in 1993, with the northern half of the city transferred to the new district of Grande Prairie-Smoky, and the remainder becoming Grande Prairie-Wapiti.

In 2017, the Electoral Boundaries Commission recommended re-uniting the two halves of the city into a new, urban-only district called Grande Prairie, abolishing Grande Prairie-Smoky. The rural areas to the north and east, along with some neighbourhoods on the east side of the city, were transferred to Grande Prairie-Wapiti, which now surrounds the new district.

Representation history

1930-1993
When the district of Peace River was split in 1930, incumbent MLA Hugh Allen (UFA) chose to run in the new district of Grande Prairie. Since no other candidates ran against him, no election was held, and he was acclaimed.

In 1935, Allen finished third, and Social Credit candidate William Sharpe won the seat up as part of the SC party's landslide victory. However, he served only one term as MLA.

In 1940, the traditional parties - the Liberals and Conservatives - attempted to defeat Social Credit by running joint candidates as independents in what became known as the Unity Movement. Their candidate in Grande Prairie, Lewis O'Brien, defeated Sharpe and other candidates. He won on the second count (rural Alberta elections were conducted using Alternative Voting at that time.). He, too, served only one term as MLA, and did not run for re-election. O'Brien was the only opposition member ever elected in Grande Prairie, making the riding something of a bellwether while it existed. 

Social Credit took Grande Prairie back in the 1944 election, with candidate Ira McLaughlin easily cruising to victory. He was re-elected six more times, serving as MLA until 1971. In these elections, any votes cast for opposition candidates produced no representation.

Progressive Conservative candidate Winston Backus won Grande Prairie in 1971. The PCs held the riding until it was abolished, but Backus served only two terms, retiring in 1979. The next PC candidate, Elmer Borstad, served only one term.

The riding's final representative was Bob Elliott, who became MLA in 1982 and served three terms, until Grande Prairie was split in 1993.

Current district
In the 2019 election, Grande Prairie elected Tracy Allard of the newly-formed United Conservative Party as MLA.

Election results

1930s

|}

|-
!colspan=6|Second count

|colspan=2|Neither
|align=right|1,198

|}
Final count swing reflects increase in vote share from the first count.

1940s

|-
!colspan=6|Second count

|colspan=2|Neither
|align=right|211

|}

|}

|}

1950s

|}

|}
In 1959, Alberta abandoned instant runoff voting in rural districts, instead electing MLAs by the first past the post method. Although a second round had not been needed in Grande Prairie since 1940, this change is evident in the dramatic drop in rejected (incorrectly marked) ballots.

|}

1960s

|}

|}

1970s

|}

|}

|}

1980s

|}

|}

|}

2010s

Plebiscite results

1957 liquor plebiscite

On October 30, 1957 a stand alone plebiscite was held province wide in all 50 of the then current provincial electoral districts in Alberta. The government decided to consult Alberta voters to decide on liquor sales and mixed drinking after a divisive debate in the Legislature. The plebiscite was intended to deal with the growing demand for reforming antiquated liquor control laws.

The plebiscite was conducted in two parts. Question A asked in all districts, asked the voters if the sale of liquor should be expanded in Alberta, while Question B asked in a handful of districts within the corporate limits of Calgary and Edmonton asked if men and woman were allowed to drink together in establishments.

Province wide Question A of the plebiscite passed in 33 of the 50 districts while Question B passed in all five districts. Grande Prairie voted in favour of the proposal by a solid majority. Voter turnout in the district was abysmal, and one of the lowest districts in the province falling well under the province wide average of 46%.

Official district returns were released to the public on December 31, 1957. The Social Credit government in power at the time did not considered the results binding. However the results of the vote led the government to repeal all existing liquor legislation and introduce an entirely new Liquor Act.

Municipal districts lying inside electoral districts that voted against the Plebiscite were designated Local Option Zones by the Alberta Liquor Control Board and considered effective dry zones, business owners that wanted a license had to petition for a binding municipal plebiscite in order to be granted a license.

References

Alberta provincial electoral districts
Grande Prairie